Madaripur, being a part of the Dhaka Division, is a district in central Bangladesh.

History
Madaripur subdivision was established in 1854 under the district of Bakerganj. In 1873 it was separated from Bakerganj and annexed to Faridpur district. Madaripur subdivision was turned into a district in 1984. Madaripur district was named after the Sufi saint Sayed Badiuddin Ahmed Zinda Shah Madar (d. 1434 CE).

Administrative areas 
Madaripur district has 3 Parliamentary seats, 4 Upazilas, 5 Police Stations, 4 Municipalities, 59 Union Parishads, 1062 Villages and 479 Mouzas.

Parliamentary seats

Upazilas and thanas
Madaripur is divided into 5 Upazilas / 5  Thanas
 Madaripur Sadar
 Kalkini
 Rajoir
 Shibchar
 Dasar

Municipalities 
 Madaripur Municipality
 Kalkini Municipality
 Rajoir Municipality
 Shibchar Municipality
 Dasar Municipality

Demographics 

According to the 2011 Bangladesh census, Madaripur District had a population of 1,165,952, of which 574,582 were males and 591,370 were females. Rural population was 1,008,142 (86.47%) while urban population was 157,810 (13.53%). Madaripur had a literacy rate 47.97% for the population 7 years and above: 50.11% for males and 45.93% for females.

Muslims make up 87.80% of the population, while Hindus are 12.10%. The Hindu population has decreased from 1991 to 2011.

Administration
 Administrator of Zila Porishod: Munir Chowdhury
 Deputy Commissioner & District Magistrate (DC): Dr.Rahima Khatun

Education 
The total number of educational institutions in Madaripur District is 213. Literacy rate: 59%
 College: 21 (including 3 government)
Boheratola Mohila College
Borhamganj Government College
Government Sufia Mohila College
Madaripur Government College
Nurul Amin University College
Shekh Hasina Women's Degree College
Shibchar Nandokumar High School and College
Syed Abul Hossain University College, Kalkini, Madaripur.
 Secondary school: 138

  1. Tatibari Islamia High school
  2. Ishibpur High School
  3. Krokchar High School
  4. Hossenpur High School
  5. Birmohon High School
  6. Algi High School
  7. G.C. Academy
  8. Madaripur Public High School
  9. Shohid Baccu High School
  10. Shamsun Nahar Bhuiyan Girls High School
  11. Kulpoddi High School
  12. Khatia High School
  13. Panchar High School
  14. Madborerchar High School
  15. Bakhorerkandi High School
  16. Dr. Saleha Selim High School
  17. Untied Islamia Government High School
  18. Don-van Government Girls High School

 Primary School: 677

  1. 94 No. Tatibari Government Primary School
  2. 08 No. Jhikorhati Government Primary School
  3. H.T Aditto Government Primary School
  4. 57 No. Purbo Housdi Government Primary School
  5. 60 No. Uttar Dudhkhali Government Primary School
  6. 56 No. Durgaboddi 2 No. Government Primary School
  7. Mithapur Government Primary School
  8. Notun Razar Hat Government Primary School
  9. Algi Government Primary School
  10. 166 No. Uttar Bakhrar Kandi Borobari Chowdhury Shamsul Huda Government Primary School
  11. 64 No. Bahadurpur Government Primary School
  12. Tithir para Government Primary School
  13. 68 No. Birangol Government Primary School
  14. Hossenpur Government Primary School
  15. 12 No. Rukhdi Nagardi Government Primary School
  16. 14 No. Tekerhat Government Primary School
  17. 181 No. Uttar Jhikarhati Government Primary School
  18. 18 No. Kabirajpur Government Primary School
  19. 32 No. Badarpasha Government Primary school
  20. Panchkhola Board Government Primary School
  21. 101 No. Datta Kendua government Primary School
  22. 14 No. Birmohon Government Primary School
  23 Trivagi Government Primary School
  24. Malek Dhali Register Government Primary School

 Madrasa: 69
  1. Shatbaria Nur-E- Mohammad(s) Dakhil Madrasha
  2. Mithapur Nurani Madrasha
  3. Chorgobindopur Alim Madrasha
  4. Uttar Chorgobindopur Mia Dakhil Madrasha
  5. Madaripur Ahmodia Kamil Madrasha
  6. Bahadurpur Shariatia Alia Kamil (MA) Madrasah

Notable residents

Rivers 
There are about 10 rivers in Madaripur district. They are -
 Padma River,
 Arial Khan River,
 Kumar Upper River,
 Kumar Lower River,
 Visarkanda-Bagda River,
 Torquee River,
 Palrodi River
 Palang River,
 Madaripur Beel Route River and
 The Mayankata River.

Place of interest 
 Shah Madar (RA) Dargah Sharif,
 The Shrine of Sufi Amir Shah (RA),
 Algi Kazibari Mosque - Bahadurpur,
 Raja Ram Mandir - Khalia,
 Jhaoudi Giri - Jhaoudi,
 Auliapur Neelkuthi - Chilarchar,
 Mithapur Zamindar Bari - Mithapur
 Pranab Math - Bajitpur,
 Mather Bazaar Math - Khoajpur,
 Khalia Shanti Kendra - Khalia,
 Parboter Bagan - Mastofapur,
 Madaripur Shakuni Lake,
 Senapati Dighi - Amaratola & Khatial,
 Charmuguria Eco-Park,
 Narayan Mandir - Panichatra,
 Kulpadi Zamindar Bari and Weather office.

See also
 Dhaka Division
 Districts of Bangladesh

Notes

References

 
Districts of Bangladesh
Districts of Dhaka Division